Red Hot Skate Rock is a 30-minute music film filmed on September 20, 1987 by Vision Street Wear at the Vision Skate Escape in Los Angeles. The film features an 8-song performance by the Red Hot Chili Peppers during the band's The Uplift Mofo Party Plan tour and includes skate demos by skateboarders Tony Hawk, Mike McGill, Steve Caballero, Chris Miller and many more pro skaters. To date, Red Hot Skate Rock was the first and only officially released video recording of the original Red Hot Chili Peppers lineup. Guitarist Hillel Slovak died of a drug overdose less than a year later and Irons would quit shortly after Slovak's death.

Red Hot Skate Rock was released on VHS in 1988 though has since gone out of print. Vision released the film on DVD in 2002 through their website under the name Vision Classic Street Wear: Classic Sk8 volume 2 and features other skate videos from the 80's, which is also out of print and extremely hard to find.

Track listing
 "Nevermind" (studio recording) 
 "Out in L.A."
 "Me and My Friends"
 "Blackeyed Blonde"
 "Fight Like a Brave"
 "Catholic School Girls Rule"/"What Is Soul?"/"Whole Lotta Love"/"Back in Black"
 "Mommy Where's Daddy"
 "Love Trilogy"
 "Fire"

Personnel
Anthony Kiedis – vocals
Flea – bass, backing vocals
Hillel Slovak – guitar, backing vocals
Jack Irons – drums

1988 short films
1988 films
Red Hot Chili Peppers video albums
Films shot in Los Angeles